Church Bay is perhaps the most popular snorkelling beach in Bermuda.  It is located in Church Bay Park off South Road in Southampton Parish on the main island.  The reef is close to the shore and many colourful fish gather along it.

This "W" is located incorrectly on the map of Bermuda.  It is not near Wilkinson Ave nor is it in Harrington Sound.  It is located as described in the narrative.

 Church Bay beach is located in Bermuda's Southampton parish. It has always been one of our great favorites for snorkeling. This is a little cove formed by coral cliffs at the western end of the south-shore beaches. The beach area is very small and practically disappears during high tide. We usually take bus #7 to reach the Church bay beach park. The beach park is at the top of a small hill. The bus stops near the car park. A steep pathway and a staircase from the park leads down to this wonderful beach.

References

External links
 Church Bay Travel Info - Bermuda4u.com - Travel Info on Church Bay

Bays of Bermuda
Southampton Parish, Bermuda